El Dandy is a television series, produced by Teleset for Sony Pictures Television and Televisa. It is based on the film Donnie Brasco directed by Mike Newell in 1997.

The series is written by Larissa Andrade and Rodrigo Ordoñez, and directed by Chava Cartas and Mauricio Cruz. Daniel Ucros and Gabriela Valentan are the Executive producers.

Starring by Alfonso Herrera, Damián Alcázar and Itahisa Machado.

Plot 
Inspired by the  1997 American drama Donnie Brasco, El Dandy tells the story of a law professor who has been hired by the Attorney General, to participate in a program of special operations, where he must infiltrate one of the most notorious drug cartels of Mexico City. Under the false name Daniel "El Dandy" Bracho (Alfonso Herrera), he begins the task of identifying all the members of this clandestine network. However, he quickly finds that his acute ability to police work is only comparable with the exciting sense of danger that experiences living life to the fullest. Along the way, it avails itself of the help of a criminal's petty, loyal, even corrupt, ally called El Chueco (Damián Alcázar), who quickly befriends Bracho and comes dangerously close to discover his true identity. Much deeper, Bracho is involved in the mafia, more work tells him to get out, and the professor, once incorruptible, has to choose between returning to a normal life as a respectable citizen or fully embrace his criminal life.

Cast

Main 
 Alfonso Herrera as Daniel "El Dandy" Bracho / José "Pepe" Montaño
 Damián Alcázar as Juan Antonio Ramírez / El Chueco
 Gabriela Roel as María Luisa 
 Itahisa Machado as Leticia Albarrán

 Aleyda Gallardo as Fidela
 Danny Perea as Dr. Itzel / Noemí
 Francisco Pakey as El Esquimal
 Fátima Molina as Deyanira
 Héctor Holten as Procurador
 Carlos Valencia as Díaz
 Amorita Rasgado as Amaranta
 Aketza López as Jorge
 Elba Jiménez as Marcela
 Alejandro de Marino as Carlos Galindo / El Menonita
 Jerónimo Fernández as unknown
 Julia Urbini as Emilia

Recurring 
 Roberto Carlo as Jacques Jr.
 Alejandro Speitzer as Serch
 Oliver Avendaño as Richi Díaz
 Luis de Alba as Ecadio
 Claudio Roca as Diego Durand
 Ana Laverde as Primavera

Special participation 
 Dagoberto Gama as José Luis Zamacona / El Negro
 Hernán Mendoza as La Güera
 Daniel Martínez as Filiberto Ortega
 Christian Vazquez as Toño

Broadcast 
The series airs worldwide on TNT Series. The series premiered on October 26, 2015, in Latin America. The series premieres on TNT on October 30, 2015, and where will summarize weekly every Friday.

References

External links 

Mexican telenovelas
Televisa telenovelas
Spanish-language telenovelas
Colombian telenovelas
Sony Pictures Television telenovelas
2015 Colombian television series debuts
2015 Mexican television series debuts
2015 American television series debuts
2015 telenovelas
Spanish-language American telenovelas
American telenovelas
2016 Colombian television series endings
2016 Mexican television series endings
2016 American television series endings